Roberto Nicolosi (November 16, 1914 – April 4, 1989) was an Italian jazz double-bassist and leader born in Genoa.

Nicolosi learned piano, violin, guitar, trumpet, and vibraphone in addition to the bass, and worked extensively as an arranger, including for Kramer Gorni and Aldo Rossi. He led his own ensembles in the 1950s which included Franco Cerri, Gil Cuppini, Oscar Valdambrini, and Glauco Masetti. He also composed film scores in the 1950s and 1960s.

References

"Roberto Nicolosi". The New Grove Dictionary of Jazz. 2nd edition, ed. Barry Kernfeld.

Italian jazz double-bassists
Italian jazz bandleaders
Musicians from Genoa
1914 births
1989 deaths